TV Novel: Land of Gold is a 2014 South Korean morning soap opera broadcast by KBS2 starring Kang Ye-sol, Kang Eun-tak, Baek Seung-hee and Lee Byung-hoon. It premiered on January 6, 2014, airing from Mondays to Fridays at 9:00 a.m. for 163 episodes.

Cast
Kang Ye-sol as Jung Soon-geum
Park Ha-young as young Soon-geum
Kang Eun-tak as Kang Woo-chang
Uhm Do-hyun as young Woo-chang
Baek Seung-hee as Han Jin-kyung
Ahn Eun-jung as young Jin-kyung
Lee Byung-hoon as Yoon Jung-soo
Jung Jae-min as young Jung-soo
Kwon Oh-hyun as Jung Soo-bok
Song Young-jae as Kim Bong-dal
Kim Jin-gook as Woo-chang's father
Lee Hwa-young as Deok-goo's mother
Jo Seon-hyung as Jang Deok-goo
Hyun Seok-joon as young Deok-goo
Jeon Won-joo as Inn owner
Park Ha-eun as Deok-boon
Jung Ae-ri as Madam Sewoondang
Kim Myung-soo as Han Chi-soo
Kim Do-yeon as Ji Yeon-hee
Yoo Seung-bong as Haeng Rang-ah-bum
Shin So-yi as young Jo Mi-ja
Jo Hye-sun as Jo Hyang-ja
Kim Esther as young Jo Hyang-ja
Cha Da-young as Mi-soon
Park Sung-il as Dok-sa
Kim Young-bae as Yang Bang-gi
Song Kyung-hoon as Han Jae-il
Jo Sung-beom as young Jae-il
Lee Hyun-kyung as Seo In-ok
Choi Chang-yeob as Yoon Young-soo
In Ji-won as young Young-soo
Yoo Ah-mi as Ssera
Choi Jong-nam as Yak Jae-sang
Kim Joo-young as Park In-tae
Shim Yang-hong as Chairman Baek
Park Hye-young as Seo Hyun-jae
Shin Cheol-jin as Chairman Lee
Jung Yoo-geun as Kang Jin-woo
Im Jae-geun as Hwang Gae-dong

Awards and nominations

References

External links
Land of Gold official KBS website 

Korean Broadcasting System television dramas
2014 South Korean television series debuts
2014 South Korean television series endings
Korean-language television shows
South Korean romance television series